Karl Laufkötter (18 May 1899 – 14 December 1993) was a German operatic tenor who specialised in character-tenor roles. 

He was born on 18 May 1899 in Düsseldorf, Germany.

In the 1930s and 40s he was engaged by the Metropolitan Opera as one of their leading tenors, famously performing Mime in Siegfried (opera) alongside Lauritz Melchior. Other roles sung during his time at the company include: Vashek in The Bartered Bride, Narraboth in Salome (opera), Walther in Tannhauser (opera), Valzacchi in Der Rosenkavalier, Monostatos in The Magic Flute, and Jacquino in Fidelio.

References

1899 births
1993 deaths
German operatic tenors
Musicians from Düsseldorf